HMS Bonaventure was a  light cruiser of the Royal Navy. Bonaventure participated as an escort vessel in Operation Fish, the World War II evacuation of British wealth from the UK to Canada. It was the largest movement of wealth in history.

Two members of her crew were killed by return fire.

She was the largest warship sunk by an Italian submarine in World War II.

References

Citations

Sources

Further reading

External links
 World War II cruisers
 HMS Bonaventure at Uboat.net
 IWM Interview with survivor Patrick Northcott
 IWM Interview with survivor Frank Connor

 

1939 ships
Dido-class cruisers
Maritime incidents in March 1941
Ships built on the River Clyde
Ships sunk by Italian submarines
World War II cruisers of the United Kingdom
World War II shipwrecks in the Mediterranean Sea